Bulan-Turgan (Bolantorğan) is a rural locality (a village) in Nadezhdinsky Selsoviet, Iglinsky District, Bashkortostan, Russia. The population was 60 as of 2010. There is 1 street.

Geography 
Bulan-Turgan is located 30 km northeast of Iglino (the district's administrative centre) by road. Staraya Kudeyevka is the nearest rural locality.

References 

Rural localities in Iglinsky District